3 Char Sau Bees is a 2010 Malayalam-language film directed by Govindankutty. This film is the debut for Govindan Kutty as a director and a screenwriter. The film released during Onam.

Plot

Char Sau Bees means 420 in Hindi which refers to a person who is up to some fraudulent activity. This movie is the story of three such people played by Govindankutty and the newcomers Rahul Menon and Anu Anandhan.  Dhanya Mary Varghese plays the female lead. Director Major Ravi appears in a cameo role in this film.

Cast

References

External links
 https://web.archive.org/web/20120321210917/http://popcorn.oneindia.in/title/9185/3-char-sau-bees.html

2010 films
2010s Malayalam-language films